Erzgebirgisch (Standard ; Erzgebirgisch: Arzgebirgsch) is a Central German dialect, spoken mainly in the central Erzgebirge (Ore Mountains) in Saxony. It has received relatively little academic attention. Due to the high mobility of the population and the resulting contact with Upper Saxon, the high emigration rate and its low mutual intelligibility with other dialects, the number of speakers is decreasing.

Language area and history 
As the following sections will show, Erzgebirgisch is very close to Upper Saxon but also has commonalities with Upper German dialects.

As of today, the Erzgebirgisch area comprises roughly the districts of Mittweida (southern area), Stollberg, Central Ore Mountain District, Annaberg-Buchholz, Freiberg (South) and Aue-Schwarzenberg. Some more speakers live in the town of Lichtenstein, in the Chemnitzer Land district.

Another community live in the Upper Harz Mountains in the Clausthal-Zellerfeld region (Lower Saxony). Their ancestors were miners and emigrated in the 16th century. Here it is referred to as the Upper Harz dialect.

Up to 1929, Erzgebirgisch was also spoken in other parts of Mittweida and Freiberg, in Chemnitz, Zwickau and in the extreme West of the Weißeritzkreis, but these areas are now dominated by Thuringian–Upper Saxon dialects.

Until 1945, the bordering Sudetenland also harbored some Erzgebirgisch speakers, namely in the Kaaden-Duppau area, in whose dialect an anthology of words, proverbs and anecdotes was published (see references). After World War II these speakers had to leave Czechoslovakia and settled down all over the FRG and the GDR. This meant that dialect usage was reduced to the family homes, entailing a shift to the local varieties of their new home towns.

No official attempts to create an orthography have been made, nevertheless there are countless short stories, poems and songs written in Erzgebirgisch. The Sächsischer Heimatverein guidelines to writing in Erzgebirgisch were established in 1937, but are by and large not respected by the majority of authors. This means that linguistic analysis of this dialect has to be done in a field work setting with native speakers. An additional threat to Erzgebirgisch is the popular misconception that Erzgebirgisch was a hillbilly variety of Saxonian, which is an issue for conservation efforts.

Erzgebirgisch is classified as a Central German dialect in linguistics, but also includes Upper German features.

Linguistic features 
Many of these languages show a tendency to substitute the German verbal prefix er- by der- (Erzg. and Bair.) or ver- (Bair. and Swabian). (e.g. westerzgeb. derschloong  German  'to slaughter'; derzeeln  German  'to tell, to narrate').

Extended use of the particle fei is typical for Upper German and popular in Erzgebirgisch.

An  in the coda, following a long vowel, is regularly deleted in Erzgebirgisch (e.g. Lichtenst. Huuschdee  . Rarely, this is also found with monosyllabic words with a short vowel, which undergo compensatory vowel lengthening in the process (e.g. Lichtenst. màà   'man').

Lichtenst. Reedlz  )

The following table illustrates the similarities between Erzgebirgisch and Upper German dialects. Thuringian/Upper Saxon is listed as a control parameter. Areas marked with a tick means that the feature is present in most subdialects, whereas areas marked as 'partial' are only found in border areas.

Subdialects 
Eastern Erzgebirgisch dialects indicate negation with   whereas nèt  is used in the West. However, this subdialectal boundary is not clearly demarcated. Thus, both forms are found in the town of Lichtenstein, which lies on the northwestern dialect boundary (although ni is perhaps more common).

It is not possible to include the Upper Harz varieties in either of these groups. Furthermore, there is a strong influence from the neighbouring non-Erzgebirgisch dialects in the region bordering Meißenisch, which makes subclassification cumbersome.

Through the summarizing of these findings, four dialects can be listed:

Phonology 
As mentioned above, there is no unified orthography. In order to render the language data close to their actual pronunciation, the following conventions have been established:

Consonants 
The rendering of the consonants follows the notation commonly used for Bavarian. The following table lists the phonemes of the most important Erzgebirgisch dialects, with the IPA value and the corresponding character used in this article.

 No subdialect shows phonemic contrast between postalveolar ) and retroflex ; they have one or the other.
Since this phonological process is completely regular, it is not reflected in orthography.
  is normally realized as a velarization of the preceding vowel. However, for the sake of clarity, this article will use  throughout.

Vowels 
The writing of the vowels presented here follows in part the official Schwyzertütsch orthography. The orthographic representation of a vowel follows after the IPA characters, if different.

 The close back vowels  are often rather unrounded.
 Short vowels preceding a stressed syllable are reduced to a schwa (e.g. gremàdig   'grammar').
 A short vowel preceding a r is lengthened (e.g. Aarzgebèèrgsch).
 In dialects spoken at higher altitudes,  is often realized like .
This might be due to overgeneralization of a pattern found in adjacent Saxonian dialects.

Stress 
Erzgebirgisch has lexical stress. There is a tendency to stress the first syllable even in French loanwords, where Standard German stresses the final syllable (e.g. biro   'office'), but loan words which follow the Standard German pattern are more numerous (e.g. dridewààr   'sidewalk' (from French )).

Morphology

Nominal morphology

Gender 
Erzgebirgisch numbers three genders, masculine, feminine and neuter. Most Erzgebirgisch lexemes have the same gender as their Standard German equivalents.

Case 

In distinction to Standard German, the Erzgebirgisch genitive is no longer productive. Other constructions have to be used to indicate possession. For animate possessors, a construction involving the possessor in the dative and an agreeing possessive pronoun is used (dem B sein A). For inanimate possessors, a construction involving  (German von) is used. A third possibility is compounding.

examples (North Western dialect):

The only case marking available for nouns is dative plural, which is marked by -n , but can often assimilate to other consonants. Nominative and accusative are not marked in the singular on nouns, but articles, adjectives and possessive pronouns help to disambiguate in these cases. Personal pronouns also have some special forms for nominative, accusative and dative.

The following table shows some Erzgebirgisch nominal declension paradigms.

For more information on articles, see below.

Number 
There are different ways to form the plural in Erzgebirgisch, a feature shared with Standard German. Next to the suffixes -e, -er, -n and -s, ablaut can also be used. Some suffixes trigger umlaut.

There are some nouns which differ in their plural marking between Erzgebirgisch and Standard German. E.g.

Examples (North Western dialect):

Articles 
Erzgebirgisch distinguishes three kinds of articles: emphatic definite article, atonal definite article, indefinite article. The emphatic definite articles are used where Standard German would use deictics like dieser and jener. The other two types closely resemble their Standard German counterparts.

All articles agree in gender, number and case with their head noun. The emphatic articles may also occur without a head noun and often replace the rarely used third person personal pronouns.

Erzgebirgisch has a negative indefinite article just like German, but the similarity to the positive indefinite article is less obvious.

The North-Western dialect has the following forms:

The article n assimilates in place of articulation to the preceding consonant. It is m before p, pf, f, w and m and ng before k, g, ch ( or ) and ng.

Examples:

Pronouns

Personal pronouns 
Personal pronouns distinguish emphatic and atonal forms, just like articles. The emphatic forms are used to highlight a participant. They are free words, whereas the atonal forms are phonologically reduced clitics.

There is no emphatic form for third person personal pronouns. The emphatic forms of the definite article have to be used instead. To outsiders this may often come across as impolite.

Unlike nouns, personal pronouns distinguish both number and case.

Pronouns with ch have sch in the Northwestern dialect.
The atonal second person singular pronoun is de when it precedes a verb, and du  when following. There are extra pronouns to express politeness, unlike German, which uses third person plural for this function.

Examples:

Possessive pronouns 
Possessive pronouns agree in case, number and gender with their head noun.

singular pronouns lose the n before another n or a -Ø-suffix.

First person plural loses the s everywhere but in the North Western dialect. First and second person plural lose the e before a suffix starting with a vowel.

This paradigm makes use of only three letters e, n and r.

examples:

Third person pronouns make heavy use of the dative construction (see above), just like nouns.

vgl.:

Prepositions 
The following construction is found mainly in Western dialects, but also in Lichtenstein:

The canonic preposition n (in) is never deleted in Lichtenstein, but almost always in the western dialects due to the more widespread dropping of n. This leads to the impression that nei is the preposition. One should also notice that goal of motion is encoded by the dative, and not by the accusative as in Standard German. The motion component is expressed by nei. This construction is also found with many other prepositions: dràà der kèrch ("an der Kirche", "bei der Kirche" at the church).

Adjectives

Agreement 
Adjectives agree with their head word in case, number, gender and definiteness.
A difference to Standard German is the non-distinction of forms with indefinite article and forms without any article.

The following table lists all agreement suffixes for adjectives:

More examples

Comparison 
The comparative is formed with the suffix -er.
The standard of comparison is marked with the preposition wii (wie). The superlative is obtained by adding . Agreement suffixes come after these suffixes.

examples:

Verbs 
The verb agrees in person and number with the subject of the sentence. This is true of both full verbs and auxiliaries.

Two tense/aspects are morphologically distinguished, present tense and preterite. Use of the preterite is found almost exclusively with strong verbs, i.e. verbs involving ablaut.

The other tenses are formed with auxiliaries: Perfect, Pluperfect, Futur I and Futur II. Perfect and preterite are used interchangeably.
Pluperfect expresses anteriority in the past. Futur II is mainly used for epistemic statements about past events (cf. German: Er wird wohl wieder nicht da gewesen sein. He has probably not attended again.)

Infinitive and participles 
The infinitive and the present participle and the past participle are formed with the following affixes:

Present tense 
Erzgebirgisch distinguishes strong verbs, involving ablaut, and weak verbs, without ablaut. Both classes take the same suffixes. The present tense can be used to refer to events in the present or future.

The suffixes are sometimes assimilated to the stem, as can be seen from hàm, `to have'.

Preterite 
As mentioned above, the preterite form is only used with strong verbs. Weak verbs use the perfect instead. This is also gaining ground with strong verbs. Formation of the preterite does not always follow the same pattern as in Standard German e.g. schmecken `to taste' is a weak verb in Standard German (preterit schmeckte), but a strong verb is Erzgebirgisch (present tense: schmègng preterite:  with ablaut. Another verb which is weak in Standard German but strong in Erzgebirgisch is frààn (Standard German fragen to ask), preterite  (Standard German fragte, asked).

Agreement with the subject is indicated as follows:

Perfect, pluperfect 
Perfect and pluperfect are construed with a finite form of the auxiliaries sei- and hàb- and the past participle of the full verb.

Examples:

Future 
Two future tenses are distinguished. Future I is used for any reference time in the future, Future II has the meaning of future anterior.
Future is formed with the auxiliary wèèr- (Standard German werden). Future I adds the infinitive of the full verb, future II the auxiliary sei or hab in the infinitive and the past participle of the full verb.

Examples:

Subjunctive 
Erzgebirgisch has a productive subjunctive for most of the auxiliaries and some other frequently used verbs. The form is derived from the preterite by ablaut. Other verbs have to use duun support in order to appear in the subjunctive.

Imperative 
The imperative is identical to first person present tense indicative. In order to obtain the plural imperative, -d is suffixed to the singular form.

example:

Passive 
The passive is formed with the auxiliary wèèr- (German werden) and the past participle of the full verb.

Example:

A sample of Erzgebirgisch speech (Lichtenstein dialect)

Sample text 

The following snippet contains the introduction and the first stanza of a wedding poem from Clausthal (1759) and is written in the Oberharz dialect:

Aſs t'r Niemeyer ſeine Schuſtern in de Kerch zur Trauer kefuͤhrt prengt aͤ  Vugelſteller Vugel un hot Baͤden kratelirt iſs k'ſchaͤn d. 25. Oktober 1759. Clasthol kedruͤckt bey den Buchdrucker Wendeborn.

Translation
When Niemeyer lead his bride to the church to marry her, a bird trapper brought birds and congratulated them; This happened on October 25 in 1759. Clausthal, printed at the Wendeborn Printing House.

Hello you all, you honorable men!
Here comes the lad from far away,
He has already taken the liberty,
So he came in this time again.
They have sometimes given him something to earn:
I have nice birds, do you want to have a look on them?

Lexicon 
Like all dialects, Erzgebirgisch has some words which are difficult to grasp for outsiders. These include contractions of long words, but also some words unknown to other dialects or even other subdialects of the same lineage.

Nouns

Verbs 
Erzgebirgisch has many onomatopoetic verbs (see also I. Susanka). Due to the high precipitation in the Ore Mountains, many different verbs for different kinds of rain or drizzle exist.

Other words 
Like many other German dialects, Erzgebirgisch is rich in adverbs, like the notorious fei, whose use is extremely complex and needs further research. It appears in commands (Gii fei wag!, Go away!), but also in affirmations (S´reengd fei, It's raining, by the way.).

Interjections 
The interjections used in Erzgebirgisch differ considerably from the Standard German ones. The language area being dominated by mining, some linguistic patterns peculiar to this business have attained general usage, like the salute Glig auf! (dt. "Glück auf").

English does not have a specialized form to affirm negative questions, unlike French (si), Dutch (jawel) or German (doch). Erzgebirgisch uses Ujuu! , or sometimes Ajuu! , (dt. "Doch!") in these contexts.
For the negation of a question expecting a positive answer È(schà)!  (dt. "Nein!") is used. This interjection is also used to express surprise, albeit with a different intonation.

References

Literature

Grammars and other linguistic publications 
 Oswin Böttger: Der Satzbau der erzgebirgischen Mundart. Leipzig 1904. – An analysis of the syntax.
 Erich Borchers: Sprach- und Gründungsgeschichte der erzgebirgischen Kolonie im Oberharz. Marburg 1929. – Grammar of the Upper Harz variety.

Other literature 
 Irmtraud Susanka: Wie mir drham geredt homm. Unsere Mundart im Bezirke Kaaden-Duppau. Verlag des Kaadener Heimatbriefs, Bayreuth (no year, no ISBN). – Collection of words, phrases, poems and short stories of the southern variety formerly spoken in the Sudetenland.

External links 
 A western Erzg. wordlist and some further literature
 A wordlist of the variety in Thalheim
 Some poems in Erzg.
 Some short stories in Erzg.

German dialects
Culture of the Ore Mountains